Nicole Safft (born 19 November 1975), known professionally as Rollergirl, is a German singer with a number of successful tracks such as "Dear Jessie" (a loose cover of the Madonna song) and "Luv U More", a cover of the Sunscreem song.

Biography
The love for rollerskates developed early when working at a rollerskating rink. Safft was discovered by German producer Alex Christensen on Mallorca and signed up for auditions. In 1999, Christensen  produced the song "Dear Jessie" for Rollergirl, which was successful as the opening song at a techno-parade in the United Kingdom, where Safft continued to work using the stage name, 'Nicci Juice'. The pseudonym Rollergirl was taken from Heather Graham's role as a naive young porn starlet in the film Boogie Nights.

"Geisha Dreams" (2002) was Rollergirl's last release before she retired to focus on her private life, including Christensen and their son, born in 2003. Safft has also appeared with Daniel Hartwig as co-presenter of the German television channel RTL 2's The Dome and Megaman 2002.

Personal life
Safft is married to Alex Christensen. They have a son born in 2003.

Discography

Albums
 2000 - Now I'm Singin'... And the Party Keeps On Rollin'''
 2001 - Now I'm Singin'... And the Party Keeps On Rollin''' (revised version) - #19 SWE chicken

Singles

References

External links
 
 

1975 births
Living people
People from Lünen
21st-century German women singers